Yu An-shun (born 5 November 1967) is a Taiwanese actor. He was the lead actor in Hou Hsiao-hsien's The Time to Live and the Time to Die (1985).

Filmography

Film

Television series

Awards and nominations

External links

1967 births
Living people
20th-century Taiwanese male actors
21st-century Taiwanese male actors
Taiwanese male film actors
Taiwanese male television actors